The FA Cup, from this season onwards, began to incorporate a series of qualifying rounds in order to determine qualifiers for the actual Cup competition itself. The qualifying rounds were made up of amateur teams, semi-professional teams, and professional sides not yet associated with the Football League. The only game to be played on Christmas Day took place, Linfield Athletic beating Cliftonville 7–0. Everton became the first Football League team to withdraw from the Cup after drawing Ulster in the first qualifying round.

See 1888–89 FA Cup for details of the rounds from the First Round onwards.

First qualifying round
6 October 1888
 Ashington 0–4 Elswick Rangers
 Chester 2–2 Macclesfield Town – Home team Disqualified
 Dulwich 0–13 London Caledonians
 Kettering 3–4 Newark
 Stoke 1–2 Warwick County
 Maidenhead 4–0 Old Etonians
 Rochester 2–4 Old Harrovians
 Old Wykehamists 1–2 Chatham
 Notts County 4–1 Eckington Works
 Old Foresters 2–0 Schorne College
 Blackburn Olympic W-W Fleetwood Rangers – Walkover Home
 Sheffield Heeley 6–1 Redcar
 Grimsby Town 1–1 Lincoln City 
 Clitheroe 3–2 Blackburn Park Road
 Irwell Springs 4–5 Southport Central
 Hurst 0–0 Bolton Wanderers
 Middlesbrough 0–1 Ecclesfield
 Hartford St John's 1–7 Nantwich
 Old Brightonians W-W Hendon (1) – Walkover Home
 Rawtenstall 3–4 Rossendale
 Casuals W-W Hitchin – Walkover Home
 Burton Swifts 1–3 Leek
 Luton Town 4–0 Reading
 Burton Wanderers 3–0 Wednesbury Old Ath.
 Lancing Old Boys 4–0 Millwall Rovers
 Horncastle 2–1 Grantham
 Chesham 4–2 Lyndhurst 
 Basford Rovers 3–1 Belper Town (1)
 Crusaders 5–1 Royal Engineers
 Wellington St George's 1–1 Shrewsbury Town
 Newcastle West End 7–2 Bishop Auckland Church Inst.
 Morpeth Harriers 5–0 Whitburn
 Over Wanderers 1–5 Chester St Oswalds – Home team Disqualified
 Great Bridge Unity 0–1 Aston Shakespeare
 Scarborough 2–0 Whitby (1)
 Newcastle East End 3–1 Port Clarence
 Park Grange 1–0 Rotherham Swifts
 Liverpool Stanley 3–0 Workington (1)
 Heywood Central 2–3 Astley Bridge
 Birtley 2–0 Darlington
 Sunderland Albion 8–2 Shankhouse
 Ulster W-W Everton – Walkover Home
 Gorton Villa 2–6 West Manchester
 Beeston St John's 2–0 Notts Olympic
 Doncaster Rovers 1–9 Rotherham Town
 Wrexham 3–0 Davenham

Replay
13 October 1888
 Bolton Wanderers W-W Hurst – Walkover Home
 Lincoln City 1–1 Grimsby Town
 Shrewsbury Town 2–1 Wellington St George's

20 October 1888
 South Bank 4–0 Sheffield

2nd Replay
24 October 1888
 Grimsby Town 3–1 Lincoln City

Second qualifying round

Replays

Third qualifying round

Fourth qualifying round

Replays

Second replay

References

 FA Cup Results Archive

Qualifying
FA Cup qualifying rounds